Crozier is an unincorporated community and census-designated place (CDP) in Mohave County, Arizona, United States. The population was 21 at the 2020 census.

Geography
Crozier is located in eastern Mohave County at  (35.422807, −113.648642), along Arizona State Route 66, the former US 66.

Demographics

As of the 2010 census, there were 14 people living in the CDP: 7 male and 7 female. 0 were 19 years old or younger, 2 were ages 20–34, 0 were between the ages of 35 and 49, 7 were between 50 and 64, and the remaining 5 were aged 65 and above. The median age was 59.0 years.

The racial makeup of the CDP was 92.9% White, and 7.1% Other.  7.1% of the population were Hispanic or Latino of any race.

There were 8 households in the CDP, 4 family households (50%) and 4 non-family households (50%), with an average household size of 1.5. Of the family households, all 4 were married couples living together, while the non-family households consisted of 4 adults living alone: 2 male and 2 female.

The CDP contained 11 housing units, of which 8 were occupied and 3 were vacant.

Education
The Valentine Elementary School District, which contains Crozier, has its single K-8 school in Truxton.

References

Census-designated places in Mohave County, Arizona